An umbrella defense is a formation used in field sports:

 Rugby league
 American football

See also:

 Umbrella